Clemens Walch (born 10 July 1987) is an Austrian footballer who plays for SPG Silz/Mötz as a right midfielder.

Club career
He signed a professional contract with VfB Stuttgart until 2011.

On 12 August 2010 Walch moved to 1. FC Kaiserslautern. After a year and a half with Kaiserslautern, he was loaned to Dynamo Dresden., before leaving the club permanently six months later, to return to his homeland with SV Ried.

Career statistics

References

External links

1987 births
Living people
People from Innsbruck-Land District
Austrian footballers
Austrian expatriate footballers
FC Red Bull Salzburg players
Association football midfielders
VfB Stuttgart players
VfB Stuttgart II players
1. FC Kaiserslautern players
Dynamo Dresden players
SV Ried players
WSG Tirol players
Bundesliga players
2. Liga (Austria) players
Austrian Football Bundesliga players
Expatriate footballers in Germany
Austrian expatriate sportspeople in Germany
3. Liga players
Footballers from Tyrol (state)